The Fort Worth Braves were a professional American football team based in Fort Worth, Texas. The team, first known as the Fort Worth Texans, was announced in 1967 as a member of the Texas Football League, and played their 1967 home games at Turnpike Stadium. The franchise was renamed as the Braves and moved its home games to Farrington Field for the 1968 season. In 1969 the Braves, along with the rest of the TFL, joined the Continental Football League as part of its new Texas Division.

When the COFL folded after its 1969 season the Braves returned as part of a fully autonomous, six-team TFL. The 1970 Braves made the postseason and advanced to the TFL title game, where they lost 21-17 to the San Antonio Toros. The Braves were just one of the four TFL franchises to remain in the league when it changed its name to the Trans-American Football League (TAFL) in late 1970. The TAFL lasted just one season, after which it and the Braves ceased operations.

Season-by-season

References

Continental Football League teams
Defunct American football teams in Texas
American football teams in the Dallas–Fort Worth metroplex
Sports in Fort Worth, Texas
American football teams established in 1967
Sports clubs disestablished in 1970
1967 establishments in Texas
1970 disestablishments in Texas